Altona (formerly LaPier & Walnut Grove) is a village in Knox County, Illinois, United States. The population was 531 at the 2010 census, down from 570 in 2000. It is part of the Galesburg Micropolitan Statistical Area.

History
Altona was originally called La Pier, and under the latter name was laid out in 1834.

Geography

Climate

Demographics

At the 2000 census, there were 570 people, 216 households and 160 families residing in the village. The racial make-up was 99.47% White, 0.18% Asian, 0.35% from other races. Hispanic or Latino of any race were 0.88% of the population.

There were 216 households, of which 32.9% had children under the age of 18 living with them, 62.5% were married couples living together, 7.9% had a female householder with no husband present, and 25.9% were non-families. 22.7% of all households were made up of individuals, and 11.6% had someone living alone who was 65 years of age or older. The average household size was 2.64 and the average family size was 3.08.

27.0% of the population were under the age of 18, 8.8% from 18 to 24, 26.7% from 25 to 44, 24.4% from 45 to 64, and 13.2% who were 65 years of age or older. The median age was 37 years. For every 100 females, there were 96.6 males. For every 100 females age 18 and over, there were 101.0 males.

The median household income was $35,729 and the median family income was $39,318. Males had a median income of $32,813 and females $21,111. The per capita income was $15,805. About 2.9% of families and 6.2% of the population were below the poverty line, including 8.1% of those under age 18 and 4.8% of those age 65 or over.

References

Villages in Knox County, Illinois
Villages in Illinois
Galesburg, Illinois micropolitan area